Tenacibaculum geojense is a Gram-negative and non-spore-forming bacterium from the genus of Tenacibaculum which has been isolated from seawater from Korea.

References

External links
Type strain of Tenacibaculum geojense at BacDive -  the Bacterial Diversity Metadatabase

Flavobacteria
Bacteria described in 2012